Piripiri may refer to:

Places
 Piripiri, Piauí, Brazil
 Piripiri, Manawatū-Whanganui, New Zealand
 Piripiri Caves and Piri Piri School, in Waitomo District, New Zealand

Plants
 Acaena (Māori: piripiri), a plant genus of the Southern Hemisphere
 Cyperus giganteus, a plant of Latin America
 Piripiri pepper, or peri-peri, a Capiscum cultivar

See also
 Hinepiripiri, a figure in Māori mythology